Aleksandra Ordina (born 15 August 1987) is a Russian amateur light welterweight boxer and 2016 European boxing champion.

References

1987 births
Living people
Russian women boxers
Light-welterweight boxers